Clibadium websteri is a species of flowering plant in the family Asteraceae. It is found only in Ecuador. Its natural habitat is subtropical or tropical moist montane forests. It is threatened by habitat loss.

References

websteri
Endemic flora of Ecuador
Endangered flora of South America
Taxonomy articles created by Polbot